Purgatory/Paradise is the ninth studio album by Throwing Muses. The album was released in the form of a book containing song lyrics, artwork and a code to download additional music. The album was named after Purgatory Road and Paradise Avenue, two roads that intersect in Middletown, Rhode Island.

Track listing
All songs written by Kristin Hersh.
 "Smoky Hands 1" – 1:09
 "Morning Birds 1" – 3:27
 "Sleepwalking 2" – 1:06
 "Sunray Venus" – 3:35
 "Cherry Candy 1" – 1:04
 "Film" – 1:49
 "Opiates" – 3:55
 "Cherry Candy 2" – 0:55
 "Freesia" – 2:42
 "Curtains 1" – 1:07
 "Triangle Quantico" – 1:15
 "Morning Birds 2" – 2:00
 "Lazy Eye" – 3:20
 "Blurry 1" – 2:25
 "Folding Fire 2" – 0:35
 "Slippershell" – 4:47
 "Bluff" – 1:01
 "Blurry 2" – 1:32
 "Terra Nova" – 2:37
 "Walking Talking" – 1:03
 "Milan" – 4:26
 "Curtains 2" – 0:44
 "Folding Fire 1" – 2:21
 "Static" – 2:41
 "Clark's Nutcracker" – 2:45
 "Dripping Trees" – 1:48
 "Sleepwalking 1" – 2:24
 "Smoky Hands 2" – 0:28
 "Speedbath" – 2:08
 "Quick" – 2:34
 "Dripping Trees 2" – 1:25
 "Glass Cats" – 2:23

Personnel
Bernard Georges – bass guitar, production
Kristin Hersh – guitars, vocals, piano, production
David Narcizo – drums and percussion, production, art direction, design

Technical personnel
Bhob Rainey – mixing
Steve Rizzo – engineering

References

External links
Throwing Muses site
Kristin Hersh site

Throwing Muses albums
2013 albums